Leeland C. Pete (November 14, 1924March 25, 2010) was an American sports-talk radio broadcaster. After serving as an Army Air Force pilot in World War II, he played college football as a quarterback at the University of Toledo. Pete also played baseball for the Rockets as an outfielder, and was inducted into the school's Varsity T Hall of Fame in 1986.  He tried out unsuccessfully with the Detroit Lions and Green Bay Packers of the National Football League (NFL).

In 1954, Pete began his sports radio career at a small station in his hometown of Toledo, Ohio. After moving to Las Vegas in 1970, he established a sports talk radio show on KDWN in 1981. The 50,000-watt station had a night signal that was heard as far north as British Columbia, south to Mexico, east to the Plains, and west to some islands in the Pacific Ocean. Pete's Stardust Line show became the longest-running sports betting show in the history of radio. He also hosted a televised sports handicapping show, Proline, on cable television that was viewed in over 30 million homes.

Pete was diagnosed with amyotrophic lateral sclerosis, a.k.a. Lou Gehrig's disease, in 2005. He died in Toledo on March 25, 2010. He was 85.

References

External links
University of Toledo Hall of Fame profile

1924 births
2010 deaths
American sports radio personalities
People from Toledo, Ohio
Toledo Rockets baseball players
Toledo Rockets football players
United States Army Air Forces pilots of World War II
Deaths from motor neuron disease